Aspergillus levisporus is a species of fungus in the genus Aspergillus. It is from the Aspergillus section. The species was first described in 2017. It has been isolated from a bedroom in the United States. It has been reported to produce auroglaucin, dihydroauroglaucin, echinulins, flavoglaucin, isoechinulins, neoechinulins, and tetrahydroauroglaucin.

References 

levisporus
Fungi described in 2017